Lobo (International title: She Wolf: The Last Sentinel / ) is a Philippine supernatural–fantasy horror TV series produced by ABS-CBN. It premiered from January 28, 2008 to July 11, 2008 replacing Patayin sa Sindak si Barbara and replaced by Iisa Pa Lamang and Dyosa on ABS-CBN's Primetime Bida evening block and worldwide on The Filipino Channel. It was topbilled by Piolo Pascual with Angel Locsin and was the most expensive teleserye made by ABS-CBN.

The series is streaming online on YouTube.

Overview

Production
In 2004, Lobo was already planned as a project by ABS-CBN with the original storyline centering on siblings who are both wolves. Robin Padilla was the first choice of ABS-CBN for the role "Noah" with Claudine Barretto as "Lyka". Kristine Hermosa and Bea Alonzo were also considered but these pairings was scrapped when Padilla transferred to GMA-7. In early 2007, John Lloyd Cruz and Anne Curtis were also offered the lead roles but turned them down due to a prior commitment to return to their roles for the sequel to the television drama Maging Sino Ka Man. The show finally began formal preparations, training, and filming with the transfer of Angel Locsin to ABS-CBN. The management decided to pair her with Piolo Pascual. Heart Evangelista was also offered "Gabriella"'s role now played by Shaina Magdayao. The choice of the dog who portrays Lyka's white wolf alter-ego brought about ABS-CBN's decision to buy a purebred dog named Brasca a White Shepherd all the way from France costing P200,000.

Summary

The plot revolves around young lovers Lyka Raymundo (played by Angel Locsin) and Noah Ortega (played by Piolo Pascual). Lyka is a young woman aspiring to be a fashion designer, working as a fashion assistant in the House of Elle. She lives with her aunt Clara and her step cousin Anton.

Noah is the adopted son of General Leon Cristobal, who takes over guardianship of Noah after his real father, Emil Ortega, dies in a tragic accident involving an unknown wolf. Noah is a second lieutenant of the Philippine Army, being actively recruited to join the Luna force, an elite team specializing in protecting humans from dangerous werewolves and vampires.

Lyka's position as fashion assistant to Lady Elle is foreshadowed by the fact that she is a werewolf who hasn't transformed yet, who doesn't know she is one because her werewolf mother abandons her as a child.  Her mother is Vanessa Blancaflor Raymundo, daughter of Lorenzo Blancaflor, the twin brother of Eleanor Blancaflor (played by Pilar Pilapil), owner of the fashion house icon, House of Elle.  Secretly, the Blancaflors are a powerful werewolf clan who leads the Waya Council for generations.  Destiny brings Lyka to the seat of the Wayas.

Lyka is believed to be the last hope, the “Huling Bantay” (“Last hope/Last Guardian”) of her fellow Werewolves. Lady Elle instantly senses her presence at a chance encounter, and immediately hires Lyka to work directly with her team so she could closely watch over her and help her through her transformation, which she believes would occur sometime or after her 21st birthday.

At about the same time when Lyka applies at the House of Elle, the Wayas are searching for their Huling Bantay who would have the strength and power to save the werewolf population from the deadly rays of the upcoming Red Moon (“Pulang Buwan”), a phenomenon that occurs every 500 years, which could potentially purge and destroy all the werewolves. Only the Last Guardian, the strongest Waya, can save the species by “raising the stone of Remus”.  The last “Huling Bantay” is Remus, who keeps the talisman for the next Guardian to use. Lady Elle is certain that Lyka is worthy and strong enough to be their Last Guardian.

In the House of Elle, Lyka crosses paths with Noah, Lady Elle's bodyguard and driver. Lyka and Noah fall in love, but their relationship is hindered by Noah's deep hatred for werewolves, as he blames them for killing his father and foster father. By the time they fall deeply in love, Lyka reaches her “time” - fully accepting her werewolf nature and the bigger responsibility as the Last Guardian.  Despite the many obstacles, Noah and Lyka's love for each other prevails. They marry, and together battle and defeat their enemies.

Three other characters create additional conflict: Noah's friend, Gabrielle Dizon (played by Shaina Magdayao), a deep penetration agent tasked to bring Noah over to the Luna Force for the sinister purposes to destroy and rid the country of all werewolves altogether, complicated by the fact that she is in love with Noah and truly cares for him; Anton Rivero, Lyka's step cousin, her protector against his abusive step mother Clara, and obsessively in love with Lyka; and General Silva, a secret rogue werewolf banished by the Wayas, out to seek revenge and destroy the Council.

There are two opposing groups in the story— the Lunas and the Wayas. The Lunas are organized by the Philippine Army to protect humans against werewolves and vampires, but a small faction under General Silva, holds a personal grudge against the werewolves, aiming to undermine Luna leadership and destroy the entire werewolf population.  Silva has a special interest in Noah, who is recruited not only for his superior skills, but mainly because flowing through his blood is a natural immunity to werewolf bites, a gene inherited from his father.  General Silva, together with Anton, manipulates Noah to join the force to obtain his blood and develop an antidote for the poisonous werewolf bites.

The other opposing group, the Waya Inc. is led by Lady Elle. Wayas control and preside over the affairs of the white werewolves and execute justice over the black werewolves and vampires who prey on humans. Since the vampires had retreated into hiding, the Waya mostly has to deal with the rogue werewolves, secretly working with the Lunas to provide protection for their species.

There are two warring factions among the werewolves that threaten the agreement between the Wayas and the Lunas and disturbs the peace within the population. While the white werewolves respect the human beings in their midst and live in peace with them, albeit secretly; the black werewolves kill humans, perpetuating the biggest reason why werewolves are feared. The Wayas control their species and impose justice on werewolves who drink human blood, doing their best to apprehend and kill the black werewolves.

On the night of the Red Moon, Lyka, fully accepting her role as “Huling Bantay”, successfully retrieves the Stone of Remus, narrowly losing her life, and saves her people from the purge.  She exhorts them to co-exist harmoniously with human beings, and to stop the prejudice against the black wolves.  She becomes their Head Guardian, leading the council for an integrated black and white werewolf population.

Lyka later defeats the bigger threat of her stepcousin's metamorphosis into a demon werewolf.  Anton is an accomplished chemist, whose specialty is animal diseases and virus mutations. All his life, he works towards finding a cure for his werewolf nature, believing that he was infected and does not have an inherited gene.  As a child, he is accidentally bitten by Vanessa, then in werewolf form.  General Silva hires him to work on the antidote for poisonous werewolf bites. Anton discovers  a more potent formulation, a mixture of Lyka's and Noah's blood which he injects into his system, giving him an immunity to werewolf bites, and the ability to heal his wounds quickly.  Using the Stone of Remus which he steals from Lyka, and following instructions from an ancient book General Silva has in his possession, he transforms into a powerful werewolf. Unfortunately, his distorted love and obsession for Lyka changes his soul and personality, turning him into a formidable enemy, who almost defeats Lyka and Noah in their last battle.

Celebrating their victory and the peaceful coexistence of humans and werewolves, Lady Elle toasts Noah and Lyka’s pregnancy, foreshadowing two sequels, Imortal and La Luna Sangre. Lyka and Noah are pushing two twin strollers.

Episodes

Cast and characters

Main cast

Supporting cast

Extended cast 
 Lauren Young as Zoe Cristobal
 AJ Perez as Bayani "Yani" Mendoza
 Spanky Manikan as General Crisostoco Silva / Alberto de la Rama
 Nash Aguas as Enrico "Tikboy" Kabigting
 Gio Alvarez as Elton
 Maritoni Fernandez as Dr. Vivian Lee
 Simon Ibarra as Father Ben
 Cris Villanueva as Minyong
 Ahron Villena as Andrew/Omar
 Archie Adamos as Leo
 Evelyn Buenaventura as "Mananangal"
 Janus del Prado as Choy
 Eric Fructuoso as Rodolfo
 Dionne Monsanto as Clarrise
 Eri Neeman as Dan
 Crispin Pineda
 KC Aboloc as Annie
 Timmy Cruz as Ylvana Zaragoza

Guest cast 
 Kier Legaspi as Nicholas Raymundo
 Liza Lorena as Mrs. Blancaflor
 Susan Africa as older Savannah
 Bobby Andrews as Emilio "Emil" Ortega
 Angel Aquino as young Savannah
 Sheryl Cruz as young Elle Blancaflor
 Diether Ocampo as Lorenzo Blancaflor
 Christian Vasquez as young Leon Cristobal
 Chinggoy Alonzo as Mr. Blancaflor
 Alexander Romano as young Anton
 Beatriz Saw as young Trixie
 Jacob Dionisio as young Noah Ortega / Jay-Jay
 Sharlene San Pedro as young Lyka Raymundo / Ulay

Reception

Ratings
The show premiered on January 28, 2008 with a rating of 26.4%. This registered a higher pilot reception compared to Palos and Kung Fu Kids in Mega Manila ratings. The series finale got the high ratings of 33.4% (together with The Singing Bee, which garnered 33.2% in the nationwide ratings game according to the NUTAM (Nationwide Urban TV Audience Measurement) conducted by AGB Nielsen. Its average rating was 32%, ranked 8th for the year 2008, in AGB Nielsen NUTAM survey.

Theme song
Lobo's theme song, Ikaw Ang Aking Pangarap (literal English translation: "You Are My Dream" or "You Are My Desire"), was composed by Ogie Alcasid and was originally sung by Martin Nievera. Halfway through the season, a duet version of the song, performed by Martin Nievera and Raki Vega, was introduced.

Awards and Recognitions

International release
According to ABS-CBN International Sales & Distribution, the series will soon be shown in different countries in Asia with the English title of She Wolf: The Last Sentinel. ABS-CBN Teleseryes penetrate TV landscape in other countries as it was also set to be aired in Thailand television. The series re-aired again on Jeepney TV starting March 11, 2013.

International broadcast

Sequel series

In 2010, ABS-CBN decided to produce a sequel to the series entitled, Imortal. According to ABS-CBN.com, Lia, also played by Angel Locsin, is the daughter of Noah and Lyka Ortega.

A second sequel entitled La Luna Sangre, starring Kathryn Bernardo and Daniel Padilla premiered on June 19, 2017 to March 2, 2018. The sequel series was first revealed at the company's trade launch on November 22, 2016.

See also
Imortal
La Luna Sangre
List of programs aired by ABS-CBN
List of ABS-CBN drama series

References

External links
 

2008 Philippine television series debuts
2008 Philippine television series endings
ABS-CBN drama series
Fantaserye and telefantasya
Philippine horror fiction television series
Television series by Star Creatives
Television about werewolves
Filipino-language television shows
Television shows set in the Philippines